National Party (in Spanish: Partido Nacional) was a political party in Peru.  It was founded in 1882 by Nicolás de Piérola.

Political parties established in 1882
Defunct political parties in Peru